Michael Ryan Crowley (born July 4, 1975 in Bloomington, Minnesota), is a retired American professional ice hockey player. He played parts of three seasons in the National Hockey League with the Mighty Ducks of Anaheim between 1997 and 2001, as well as several seasons in the minor American Hockey League and International Hockey League. Prior to turning professional Crowley spent three seasons with the University of Minnesota. Internationally Crowley played for the American national team at the World Junior and World Championships.

Playing career
Beginning his hockey career with the University of Minnesota, Crowley was drafted 140th overall by the Philadelphia Flyers in the 1993 NHL Entry Draft. While still playing in college, his NHL rights were traded to the Mighty Ducks of Anaheim in 1996.  It was with the Ducks where he played 67 games, scoring 5 goals and 10 assists for 15 points and collecting 44 penalty minutes.  He also had spells in the American Hockey League with the Cincinnati Mighty Ducks and the International Hockey League for the Long Beach Ice Dogs and the Grand Rapids Griffins.  He moved on to the Minnesota Wild in 2001, but was assigned to their AHL affiliate the Houston Aeros and after just 11 games for the Aeros, Crowley decided to retire.

Career statistics

Regular season and playoffs

International

Awards and honors

References

External links
 

1975 births
Living people
American men's ice hockey defensemen
Cincinnati Mighty Ducks players
Grand Rapids Griffins players
Houston Aeros (1994–2013) players
Ice hockey players from Minnesota
Long Beach Ice Dogs (IHL) players
Mighty Ducks of Anaheim players
Minnesota Golden Gophers men's ice hockey players
Philadelphia Flyers draft picks
Sportspeople from Bloomington, Minnesota
AHCA Division I men's ice hockey All-Americans